The European Green Capital Award is an award for a European city based on its environmental record. The award was launched on 22 May 2008 and the first award was given to Stockholm for the year 2010. The European Commission has long recognised the important role that local authorities play in improving the environment, and their high level of commitment to genuine progress. The European Green Capital Award has been conceived as an initiative to promote and reward these efforts.

Award process 
Starting in 2010, one European city is selected each year as the European Green Capital of the year. The award is given to a city that:
 Has a consistent record of achieving high environmental standards;
 Is committed to ongoing and ambitious goals for further environmental improvement and sustainable development;
 Can act as a role model to inspire other cities and promote best practices to all other European cities.

Eligibility 
All cities across Europe with more than 100,000 inhabitants can be a candidate for European Green Capital. The award is open to EU Member States, EU candidate countries, Iceland, Liechtenstein, Norway and Switzerland. In countries where there is no city with more than 100,000 inhabitants, the largest city is eligible to apply. Where applicable, cities may apply for either the EGCA or EGL, but not both, in any given year.

Entries are assessed on the basis of 12 indicators: local contribution to global climate change, transport, green urban areas, noise, waste production and management, nature and biodiversity, air, water consumption, waste water treatment, eco-innovation and sustainable employment, environmental management of the local authority, and energy performance.

The title is awarded by an international jury supported by a panel of supposed experts in different environmental fields.

History 
The idea of a European Green Capital was originally conceived at a meeting in May 2006 in Tallinn, Estonia. The award is the result of an initiative taken by 15 European cities (Tallinn, Helsinki, Riga, Vilnius, Berlin, Warsaw, Madrid, Ljubljana, Prague, Vienna, Kiel, Kotka, Dartford, Tartu and Glasgow) and the Association of Estonian cities, who submitted the so-called Tallinn Memorandum to the European Commission, proposing the establishment of an award rewarding cities that are leading the way in environmentally friendly urban living. The award was officially launched based on an initiative of the European Commission in May 2008, and each year one European city is selected as the European Green Capital.

Winners 
 2010:  Stockholm
 2011:  Hamburg
 2012:  Vitoria-Gasteiz
 2013:  Nantes
 2014:  Copenhagen
 2015:  Bristol
 2016:  Ljubljana
 2017:  Essen
 2018:  Nijmegen
 2019:  Oslo
 2020:  Lisbon
 2021:  Lahti
 2022:  Grenoble
 2023:  Tallinn
 2024:  Valencia

European Green Leaf 
Following the success of the European Green Capital Award (EGCA), many smaller cities sought EU recognition for their efforts and commitment in the areas of sustainability & environment.  In response, the European Commission launched a pilot European Green Leaf (EGL) initiative in 2015. The European Green Leaf's competition aims at cities between 20,000 and 100,000 inhabitants recognizing their commitment to better environmental outcomes, with a particular accent on efforts generating green growth and new jobs.

The objectives of the European Green Leaf are threefold:
 To recognise cities that demonstrate a good environmental record and commitment to generating green growth;
 To encourage cities to actively develop citizens' environmental awareness and involvement;
 To identify cities able to act as a 'green ambassador' and to encourage other cities to progress towards a better sustainability outcomes.

The European Green Leaf will be presented on an annual basis by the European Commission in conjunction with the European Green Capital Award from 2015 onwards as a stamp of approval to Smaller Cities, Growing Greener!

Winners 
 2015:  Mollet del Vallès
 2015:  Torres Vedras
 2017:  Galway
 2018:  Leuven
 2018:  Växjö
 2019:  Cornellà de Llobregat
 2019:  Horst aan de Maas
 2020:  Limerick
 2020:  Mechelen
 2021:  Lappeenranta
 2021:  Gabrovo
 2022:  Valongo
 2022:  Winterswijk

See also
 European Capital of Culture
 European Youth Capital
 European Region of Gastronomy
 List of environmental awards

References

External links 
 

Environmental awards
European awards
Community awards
Awards established in 2008